Across the Border may refer to:

"Across the Border" (Electric Light Orchestra song)
"Across the Border" (Vivid song)
"Across the Border", a song by Bruce Springsteen from his 1995 album The Ghost of Tom Joad
Across the Border (film), a 1922 western film starring Guinn "Big Boy" Williams
The alternative title of the 1938 Canadian film Special Inspector

See also
Across the Borders, a 1997 live album by Battlefield Band